Phani Bhushan is an entrepreneur specialized in Information Technology (IT). He has spearheaded many startups in the mobile applications and information technology domain. He is also known for mentoring students at various educational institutes. He is the founder for Anant Computing and Managing Director for ViaEdge.

He is best known to the public for being a "batchmate" of Google core business CEO, Sundar Pichai at the Indian Institute of Technology Kharagpur.

Career
Phani Bhushan launched and managed many IT firms in India. Initial grounding happened when he founded Construction Tiger, an IT company which helped in bridging the gap between various stakeholder of Construction Industry through collaboration platforms. He then founded ViaEdge, a firm engaged in IT infrastructure product and IT consulting. Prior to this he was with SLM Soft, a Canadian MNC company, where he was instrumental in modernizing the existing operational system by process automation and process integration at over 200 branches of Caisse d’Epargne et des Chèques Postaux (CECP), the largest banking organization of Ivory Coast. His latest brainchild is Anant Computing, a mobile applications platform, which has been the only mobile platform in India that is native for all. The platform also supports every Indian language in India, irrespective of the mobile phones supporting the particular languages or not. It also consists of an extremely futuristic feature, AppWallet, which is revolutionary in mobile application technology.

References

Businesspeople from Mumbai
Living people
IIT Kharagpur alumni
Year of birth missing (living people)